Harold Lee Lindsey (born November 23, 1929) is an American evangelical writer. He is a Christian Zionist, a dispensationalist and a television host. He wrote a series of popular apocalyptic books – beginning with the record-breaking The Late Great Planet Earth (1971) – asserting that the Apocalypse or end time (including the rapture) was imminent because current events were fulfilling Bible prophecy.

Biography
Lindsey graduated from Dallas Theological Seminary with a Master of Theology degree, majoring in the New Testament and early Greek literature. With his second wife, Jan, he worked with Campus Crusade for Christ and continued with them until 1969. He then helped a mission in Southern California which continued until 1976. He was also a frequent speaker and Sunday School teacher at Melodyland Christian Center in Anaheim, California. During 1969, he wrote his first, and best-known book, The Late Great Planet Earth.  Published during 1970 by Zondervan, this book became a bestseller. Coming on the heels of the Six-Day War, the book fueled the popularity of dispensationalism and its support of ethnic Jews as the "chosen people of God". Many of Lindsey's later writings are sequels or revisions and extensions of his first book. In 1994, he earned his Doctorate of Theology from the California Graduate School of Theology.

Lindsey hosted International Intelligence Briefing on the Trinity Broadcasting Network and serves on the executive board of Christian Voice. International Intelligence Briefing was eliminated from broadcasting by TBN for the entire month of December 2005. Lindsey claimed that this was because "some at the network apparently feel that [his] message is too pro-Israel and too anti-Muslim." TBN owner Paul Crouch, however, contended that "TBN has never been and is not now against Israel and the Jewish people." Crouch said that Lindsey's show was pre-empted for Christmas programming.

Lindsey resigned from TBN on January 1, 2006, and indicated that he would pursue another television ministry. His new program, The Hal Lindsey Report, emphasizes biblical prophecy and current events, and is broadcast by the Angel One and DayStar networks.  During January 2007, Lindsey announced that he would be returning to the TBN network. The Hal Lindsey Report is broadcast by TBN with his own financing.

Biblical interpretations 
Lindsey's claims are based on a dispensationalist interpretation of the Old and New Testament. Lindsey claims from the Bible that Jesus Christ will return from heaven to earth someday and establish eternal peace and harmony among all people.

Lindsey claims the Bible contains numerous prophecies that foretell of certain conditions and events that will occur in the world prior to Christ's return and that as these things occur, they are to serve as signs and reminders that we are in the era that the Bible calls the end times or last days. Lindsey believes a prophetic event that officially begins the end times is the regathering of the Jewish people to their ancient homeland to form an independent nation after a prolonged worldwide dispersion. He claims that the establishment of the State of Israel in May 1948 is the fulfillment of this major prophecy. According to some schools of Christian eschatology, the last seven years of the end times is a period known as the Tribulation, which is described in the gospel of Matthew and the book of Revelation.

In The Late Great Planet Earth, Lindsey wrote that the biblical prophets identified certain nations that would ally with other countries to form "four major spheres of political power" during the same era that Israel would be reestablished as a nation. Lindsey wrote that these nations and their allies can be identified as: (1) Russia with its allies, (2) China with other nations of the Orient, (3) Egypt with other Middle East countries, and (4) an alliance of Western European nations.

According to Lindsey, the alliance of Western European nations is a revived form of the ancient Roman Empire, predicted in the books of Daniel and Revelation symbolically as ten horns and ten kings. In The Late Great Planet Earth, Lindsey quotes from a 1969 Time magazine article that the goal of the European Economic Community, which preceded the European Union, was to establish a ten-nation economic community. Lindsey concludes, based on this and other sources, that this alliance will help cause the fulfillment of this prophecy and will ultimately be ruled by the Antichrist.

Lindsey noted that the prophets did not refer to the United States of America directly or indirectly. He concluded that this is an indication that the U.S. will no longer be a great geo-political power by the time the Tribulation of the end times arrives.

In a later book, titled, The 1980s: Countdown to Armageddon, he indicated that he believed it was possible that the battle of Armageddon could occur in the not too distant future, stating, "the decade of the 1980s could very well be the last decade of history as we know it." He noted again that there is no reference to the U.S. in Bible prophecy. He listed a few scenarios that seemed plausible to him at the time: (1) A takeover by communists, (2) destruction by a surprise Soviet nuclear attack, or (3) becoming a dependent of the 10-nation European community. The book was on the New York Times bestseller list for more than 20 weeks.

Works

Books
 The Late Great Planet Earth (1971) w/ C.C. Carlson
 Homo Sapiens: Extinction or Evacuation (1971)
 Reprint as World's Final Hour: Evacuation or Extinction (1976)
 Satan Is Alive and Well on Planet Earth (1972) w/ Carole C. Carlson
 The Late Great Planet Earth Song Book (1972), w/ Fred Bock
 The Guilt Trip: How to Realize God's Forgiving Love (1972)
 How to Prepare for Armageddon (1972, multiple authors)
 The Liberation of Planet Earth (1974)
 The Promise (1974)
 Hal Lindsey's There's a New World Coming (1974, comic book)   
 When is Jesus Coming Again (1974, multiple authors) 
 There's a New World Coming: An In-Depth Analysis of the Book of Revelation (1975, 1984)
 Hope for the Terminal Generation (1976)
 The Events That Changed My Life (1977)
 The 1980's: Countdown to Armageddon (1980)
 The Rapture: Truth or Consequences (1983)
 Prophetical Walk Through the Holy Land (1983)
 Combat Faith (1986)
 The Road to Holocaust (1990)
 Israel and the Last Days (1991)
 The Rise of Babylon and the Persian Gulf Crisis: A Special Report (1991) w/ Chuck Missler
 Planet Earth 2000 A.D.: Will Mankind Survive? (1994)
 The Final Battle (1995)
 Amazing Grace (1995)
 Steeling the Mind of America (1995, multiple authors)
 Blood Moon (1996)
 The Messiah (1996)
 Apocalypse Code (1997)
 Planet Earth: The Final Chapter (1999)
 Vanished into Thin Air: The Hope of Every Believer (1999)
 Combat Faith: Unshakable Faith for Every Day (1999)
 The Greatest Gift: God's Amazing Grace (1999)
 Facing Millennium Midnight (1999) w/ Cliff Ford
 The Promise of Bible Prophecy (2000)
 Why Do We Have Trials? (2001)
 The Everlasting Hatred: The Roots of Jihad (2002)
 Faith for Earth's Final Hour (2003)

Foreword by Hal Lindsey
 Birth of the Body: Acts 1-12 (1974) by Ray C. Stedman
 The Coming Russian Invasion of Israel (1974) by Thomas McCall and Zola Levitt
 The Beautiful Side of Evil (1982) by Johanna Michaelsen 
 Like Lambs to the Slaughter (1989) by Johanna Michaelsen
 The Magog Invasion (1995) by Chuck Missler
 Happy Days and Dark Nights (1996) by Jerry and Susanne McClain with Marsha Gallardo
 The Shadow of the Apocalypse: When All Hell Breaks Loose (2004) by Paul Crouch
 Personal Revival: Come Near, Come Now, Come Alive (2007) by Gary Galbraith
 America's Coming Judgment: Where is Our Hope? (2017) by Thomas J. Hughes

See also
 Christian eschatology
 Christian Voice (United States)
 Summary of Christian eschatological differences

References

External links
 
 

1929 births
Living people
20th-century apocalypticists
20th-century evangelicals
21st-century apocalypticists
21st-century evangelicals
American Christian Zionists
American critics of Islam
American evangelicals
Christian conspiracy theorists
Christian critics of Islam
Dallas Theological Seminary alumni
Evangelical writers
Trinity Broadcasting Network
University of Houston alumni
Writers from Houston